The Carey Institute for Global Good is an independent American nonprofit organization whose mission is to make a "better world by contributing to a strong, educated, and just society." Through its programs in nonfiction, sustainable communities, arts and music, and education, the Institute strives to bring together innovative and dynamic people from around the world to seek creative solutions to the most pressing challenges of the day.

The Institute is located on a 100-acre estate in Rensselaerville, New York, and the estate has a long history of social engagement and continues to host meetings, conferences and events. Businessman William P. Carey bought the estate in 2011 and founded the Carey Institute for Global Good.

Programs 

The Carey Institute offers a Nonfiction Residency for longform reporters working in all media, including print, audio, video, digital, and/or a mix of these. Residents receive lodging, workspace, meals and mentorship on the Institute’s estate. The Residency was founded on the belief that an informed, educated and engaged citizenry is essential to the functioning of a democratic society.  The Institute’s Nonfiction Residency supports this by advancing excellent long-form reporting, supporting deeply reported nonfiction about the most pressing issues of the day—and then helping to disseminate it on a variety of media platforms to the widest possible audience. The program is directed by National Book Award and Pulitzer Prize winning author Tim Weiner.

The Sustainable Communities Program supports the development of community-scale policy, practice, and leadership innovations that address global climate change resiliency and sustainability goals while enhancing the health of local economic, social, and ecological systems. The Initiative consists of the Community Partnership Program, the Helderberg Brewery & Incubator and the Hill & Mountain Farming Project.

The Institute’s Education program aims to improve education performance such that all students graduate from K-12 college and career ready and better prepared to succeed, by providing a safe and inspiring environment where educators, policymakers students, and other stakeholders can come together to learn, connect, collaborate and share. The Institute improves the quality, quantity, and retention of teachers by creating and providing high-quality professional development opportunities for teachers.

The Carey Institute’s Art and Music Initiative provides an ideal residential setting where groups of artists, musicians, and performers can come together to learn, connect, collaborate and share.  The Institute brings together artists from all over the world to participate in immersive, highly productive, creative residencies, including at the High Peaks Music Festival co-organized by cellist Yehuda Hanani.

History 
The roots of the Carey Institute go back to 1924 when Laura Talmage Huyck convened "Country Forums on Human Relations" at her home as a reaction to the carnage of World War I. The forums aimed to promote global understanding that would lead to peaceful resolutions of differences. Participants came from many countries to discuss how to achieve world peace and mutual understanding.

In 1963, The Institute on Man and Science was founded, re-establishing these fora to promote world peace. The campus in Rensselaerville would later hold meetings of international diplomats convened by UN Secretary General U Thant.

When William P. Carey purchased the campus in 2012, his dream was to re-establish the original spirit of dynamic inquiry to empower people to make informed decisions that can create meaningful change in the world.

Location 
The Institute is located on a 100-acre estate in Rensselaerville, New York. The estate overlooks Lake Myosotis and includes five residences and a gourmet restaurant.

References

1924 establishments in the United States
1924 establishments in New York (state)
Organizations established in 1924
Non-profit organizations based in New York (state)